The 2015 Worthing Borough Council election took place on 7 May 2015 to elect members of Worthing Borough Council in England. It was held on the same day as other local elections and the 2015 general election. The Conservative Party retained its control of the council, winning every seat that was up for election. 

There was no local election in Durrington or Northbrook wards this year.

References

2015 English local elections
May 2015 events in the United Kingdom
2015
2010s in West Sussex